Günter Schröter (May 3, 1927 – February 10, 2016), often nicknamed Moppel, was a German football player and coach who appeared in 39 matches for East Germany.

Career

Early years
He began playing football at young age. He played his first football matches for the youth teams of Brandenburger BC. Schröter was drafted into the Wehrmacht before his 17th birthday. He was sent to participate in World War II as part the last contingent supposed to defend Germany. Schröter was captured by Allied forces in 1945 and sent to work in an underground Polish coal mine.

Playing career
Schröter was released from captivity in 1948. He then returned to football. Schröter played for BSG Konsum Brandenburg before he joined SG Volkspolizei Potsdam in 1949. Schröter was then delegated to SV Deutsche Volkspolizei Dresden in 1950. He played as a forward for SG Dynamo Dresden from 1950 to 1954 and then for SC Dynamo Berlin from 1954 to 1963. He won the DDR-Oberliga in the 1952-53 season with SG Dynamo Dresden and the 1959 FDGB-Pokal with SC Dynamo Berlin.

Later career
After retiring from his playing career, Schröter continued as  assistant coach for SC Dynamo Berlin from 1963 to 1965. He then became the assistant coach for BFC Dynamo in 1969. He was promoted to coach in 1972. He served as coach for one year. Schröter then served as assistant coach of the reserve team BFC Dynamo II. He was also a trainer in the youth academy of BFC Dynamo. Schröter was one of the trainers responsible for shaping stars like Andreas Thom.

References

External links

1927 births
2016 deaths
Sportspeople from Brandenburg an der Havel
German footballers
East German footballers
East Germany international footballers
Association football forwards
Berliner FC Dynamo players
Dynamo Dresden players
Berliner FC Dynamo managers
German football managers
East German football managers
DDR-Oberliga players

Footballers from Brandenburg
German prisoners of war in World War II
Child soldiers in World War II